Erick Omar Torres Arias (born May 16, 1975) is a retired professional Peruvian footballer who played as a defensive midfielder. He was most recently the head coach of Deportivo Garcilaso.

Club career
Torres started his development as a footballer in the youth academy of Sport Boys Then he started his senior career playing for Internazionale San Borja in the Peruvian Second Division. Torres then played for Second Division side Unión Huaral and helped them achieve promotion by finishing champions of the 1994 Segunda División Peruana. Then in 1995 Torres transferred to Peruvian giants Sporting Cristal. Erick made his Peruvian First Division debut on March 5, 1995 in the first round of the 1995 Descentralizado season. His debut was a derby match away to rivals Universitario de Deportes, which finished in a 2–1 win for La U. Torres would score his first goal in the First Division in the following game against his previous club Unión Huaral.

Torres has also played club football for José Gálvez FBC, Alianza Lima, and Universidad César Vallejo.

International career
Erick was called up by manager Freddy Ternero and played for the Peru U-23 squad in the South American Pre-Olympic Tournament in 1996.

Between 1997 and 2006, Torres played 11 times for the Peruvian national team.

Honours

Club
Unión Huaral
 Peruvian Second Division: 1994

Sporting Cristal
 Peruvian First Division:(3) 1995, 1996, 2002
 Copa Libertadores: Runner-Up 1997
 Torneo Clausura: 2002, 2004
 Torneo Apertura: 2003

José Gálvez FBC
 Torneo Intermedio: 2011

References

External links

Living people
1975 births
People from Madre de Dios Region
Association football midfielders
Peruvian footballers
Peru international footballers
Unión Huaral footballers
Sporting Cristal footballers
José Gálvez FBC footballers
Club Alianza Lima footballers
Club Deportivo Universidad César Vallejo footballers
Universidad Técnica de Cajamarca footballers
Peruvian Primera División players
Peruvian Segunda División players
Copa Libertadores-winning players
1997 Copa América players
Deportivo Binacional FC managers
Peruvian football managers
Deportivo Garcilaso managers
Coronel Bolognesi managers